Peggy Simpson (4 July 1913 in Leeds, West Riding of Yorkshire – 1 January 1994 in London) was a British actress. She appeared twice for director Alfred Hitchcock in The 39 Steps (1935) and Young and Innocent (1937).

Partial filmography
 Sleeping Car (1933) - (uncredited)
 My Old Dutch (1934) - (uncredited)
 The Camels Are Coming (1934) - Tourist
 Temptation (1934) - Piri
 Fighting Stock (1935) - Maid
 The 39 Steps (1935) - Maid
 Everything Is Thunder (1936) - Mizi
 Where There's a Will (1936) - Barbara Stubbins
 Jack of All Trades (1936) - Typist
 Darby and Joan (1937) - Joan Templeton
 Young and Innocent (1937) - Alice - Bathing Girl (uncredited)
 Dentist in the Chair (1960) - Miss Brent
 No Kidding (1960) - Mother of Angus (final film role)

References

External links
 
 Peggy Simpson in AusStage

1913 births
1994 deaths
Actresses from Leeds
English film actresses
20th-century English actresses